Smithfield is a town in Madison County, New York, United States. Administrative offices are in the hamlet of Peterboro. The town and hamlet both are named after Peter Smith, an original land owner. As of the 2010 Census, the population was 1,288.

The Town of Smithfield is located in the center of the county.

History 
The region was first settled around 1797. The town was organized in 1807 from land taken from the Town of Cazenovia.

2014 tornado 

The tornado killed four people and destroyed several homes. One house was carried  and thrown into another home. And additionally, a 3-story house was rolled off its foundation down a hill, the occupant inside was killed.

Geography

Demographics

As of the census of 2000, there were 1,205 people, 415 households, and 315 families residing in the town.  The population density was 49.5 people per square mile (19.1/km2).  There were 446 housing units at an average density of 18.3 per square mile (7.1/km2).  The racial makeup of the town was 96.68% White, 1.00% African American, 0.83% Native American, 0.25% Asian, and 1.24% from two or more races. Hispanic or Latino of any race were 0.25% of the population.

There were 415 households, out of which 42.4% had children under the age of 18 living with them, 59.8% were married couples living together, 8.9% had a female householder with no husband present, and 23.9% were non-families. 16.9% of all households were made up of individuals, and 5.5% had someone living alone who was 65 years of age or older.  The average household size was 2.90 and the average family size was 3.25.

In the town, the population was spread out, with 31.2% under the age of 18, 7.5% from 18 to 24, 30.5% from 25 to 44, 22.9% from 45 to 64, and 7.9% who were 65 years of age or older.  The median age was 35 years. For every 100 females, there were 103.2 males.  For every 100 females age 18 and over, there were 102.2 males.

The median income for a household in the town was $35,109, and the median income for a family was $38,333. Males had a median income of $28,618 versus $23,125 for females. The per capita income for the town was $14,860.  About 12.6% of families and 16.2% of the population were below the poverty line, including 22.2% of those under age 18 and 16.8% of those age 65 or over.

Communities and locations 
Bliss Corners – A location south of Peterboro.
Eisaman Corners – A location in the northern part of the town.
Embury Corners – A location in the southeastern corner of the town.
Peterboro – A hamlet in the center of the town, where the Gerrit Smith Estate and Peter Smith Land Office are located.
Siloam – A hamlet northeast of Peterboro.

References

External links
 
 Early history of Smithfield
 Gerrit Smith information

Syracuse metropolitan area
1807 establishments in New York (state)
Populated places established in 1807
Towns in Madison County, New York